P. ansorgii may refer to:
 Phractolaemus ansorgii, commonly called hingemouth, a small freshwater fish species found in west central Africa
 Polypterus ansorgii, commonly called Guinean Bichir, a bony fish species found off of the coast of West Africa

See also
 Ansorgii